Frank Stuart Jones (1933-2019) was a British economic historian who spent most of his career at the University of Witwatersrand in South Africa and was a respected authority on the country's economy.

Selected publications

Articles
 "The imperial banks in South Africa 1861–1914", South African Journal of Economic History, Vol. 11 (1996), No. 2, pp. 21–54. https://doi.org/10.1080/10113439609511084

Books
 The South African Economy (1992) (With A. L. Muller)
 The Great Imperial Banks in South Africa (1996)
 The Decline of the South African Economy (2002) (Editor)
 The South African Economy in the 1990s (2010) (With Robert Vivian)

References 

1933 births
2019 deaths
People from Rusholme
Economic historians
Academic staff of the University of the Witwatersrand
British emigrants to South Africa